The women's 63 kilograms event at the 2014 World Weightlifting Championships was held on 12 and 13 November 2014 in Baluan Sholak Sports Palace, Almaty, Kazakhstan.

Schedule

Medalists

Records

Results

References

Results 

2014 World Weightlifting Championships
World